Rear Admiral Hugh Dominic Beard,  (born 28 December 1967) is a senior Royal Navy officer. He served as Third Sea Lord from 2018 to 2020, and as Assistant Chief of the Defence Staff (Capability & Force Design) from 2020 to 2022.

Early life and education
Beard was born on 28 December 1967 in Birmingham, England. He was educated at St Anselm's Catholic School, a comprehensive school in Canterbury, Kent. He graduated with a Master of Arts degree in defence studies from King's College London in 2003.

Naval career
Beard joined the Royal Navy in 1987, aged 19. He became commanding office of the submarine  in 2005, submarine scheduler at Navy Command in 2008, and Commander Submarine Sea Training in 2010. He went on to be commanding officer of the frigate  in 2012, and Assistant Chief of the Naval Staff (Capability) in November 2018. He served as Assistant Chief of the Defence Staff (Capability & Force Design) from January 2020 until late 2022. He retired from the navy on 27 December 2022.

Beard was appointed Companion of the Order of the Bath (CB) in the 2022 New Year Honours.

References

1967 births
Alumni of King's College London
Living people
Military personnel from Birmingham, West Midlands
Royal Navy rear admirals
Royal Navy submarine commanders
Companions of the Order of the Bath